Gene Tools, LLC is a limited liability company located in Philomath, Oregon, United States that manufactures Morpholino antisense oligos and delivery reagents. Gene Tools was founded in 1997 and began regularly shipping custom-sequence Morpholino oligos in 2000. Current products include Morpholino oligos and Vivo-Morpholinos (for improved delivery into cells). 

The manager and general partner, Jim Summerton, is a pioneer in antisense research, conceived of and was co-inventor of the Morpholino antisense oligo structural type and founded the first antisense therapeutics company, Sarepta Therapeutics Inc. (formerly AntiVirals Inc., renamed AVI BioPharma Inc., renamed Sarepta Therapeutics Inc.).

References

External links
Gene Tools

Companies based in Oregon
Benton County, Oregon
Privately held companies based in Oregon
American companies established in 1997
1997 establishments in Oregon